This is a list of spin-offs from SRI International. SRI International (SRI), previously known as Stanford Research Institute, is a research and innovation center. To bring its breakthroughs to the marketplace, SRI licenses technology and works with investment and venture capital firms to launch a wide variety of ventures. SRI has launched more than 60 spin-off ventures; this includes four public companies with combined market capitalizations exceeding $20 billion.

Engineering and systems

Legal, policy and finance

Information and computing sciences

Biosciences

Health science

Food science

Physical sciences

See also
 List of SRI International people

External links
 SRI Ventures

References

SRI International
SRI spin-offs
SRI spin-offs